Prince Michael Andreevich of Russia (15 July 1920 – 22 September 2008) was a descendant of the House of Romanov, which ruled Russia from 1613 to 1917. He was a great-nephew of Nicholas II, the last Emperor of Russia.

Early life
Prince Michael Andreevich was born in Versailles, the second child and eldest son of Prince Andrei Alexandrovich of Russia and Donna Elisabetta di Sasso-Ruffo (1886–1940). He was a grandson of Grand Duke Alexander Mikhailovich of Russia and Grand Duchess Xenia Alexandrovna of Russia and a great nephew of Nicholas II, the last Emperor of Russia. From his father's first marriage he had two siblings, an older sister Xenia and a younger brother Andrew. From his father's second marriage he had one half sister, Olga.

Neither Grand Duke Cyril Vladimirovich nor his son Grand Duke Vladimir Cyrillovich (who were heads of the House of Romanov from 1924 to 1992) recognised Michael as a Prince of Russia.  Cyril and Vladimir held that the marriage of Prince Michael Andreevitch's parents was not dynastic and that Michael had no succession rights to the Russian throne.  They accorded him the title ''HSH Prince Romanovsky-di Sasso Ruffo."

Prince Michael Andreevich was educated at Beaumont College in Old Windsor, and lived with his parents and his grandmother Grand Duchess Xenia in exile at Craigowan Lodge on the Balmoral Estate in Scotland as well as at Frogmore Cottage on the grounds of Windsor Castle. The family later stayed at Wilderness House until Michael was commissioned to serve in the Royal Navy during World War II. During the war Michael served in Australia with the Fleet Air Arm.  He moved there permanently following the conclusion of the war and became an aviation engineer.

Marriages and later life
Prince Michael Andreevich married three times. On 24 February 1953 at Sydney he married Jill Esther Blanche Murphy (1921-2006); the marriage was short lived and was dissolved by divorce in September 1953. On 23 July 1954 at Sydney he married Shirley Cramond (1916–1983). On 14 July 1993 at Sydney he married Giulia Crespi (b. 1930). Michael had no children from any of his marriages.

In 1980 Prince Michael Andreevich became Imperial protector of the Sovereign Order of the Orthodox Knights Hospitaller of St. John of Jerusalem which was formerly under the protection of his father Prince Andrei and uncle Prince Vasili. In 2006 he was elected Grand Prior. This group is not recognised by the Sovereign Military Order of Malta, or the Associated Orders of St. John. He was also vice-president of the Romanov Family Association.

Prince Michael Andreevich died at 2 am on 22 September 2008 in Sydney, the same day as his cousin, Prince Michael Feodorovich of Russia, the son of Prince Feodor Alexandrovich of Russia.

Ancestry

References

External links
 Website about the life and legacy of Prince Michael Andreevich of Russia
 The Romanoff Family Association
 Prince Romanoff laid to rest
 A prince among men, but few really knew it
 Mr Romanoff no tsar in waiting

House of Romanov in exile
1920 births
2008 deaths
Emigrants from the Russian Empire to the United Kingdom
Emigrants from the Russian Empire to Australia
Emigrants from the Russian Empire to France
People educated at Beaumont College